Edward Tiffin (June 19, 1766August 9, 1829) was an American politician from Ohio.  A member of the Democratic-Republican party, he served as the first governor of Ohio and later as a United States Senator.

Biography
Sources indicate that he was born in Carlisle; however he may have been born in or near Workington — also in the then county of Cumberland, England. Tiffin attended the Latin school in Carlisle, and became an apprentice to a student of medicine in 1778. Six years later he completed his apprenticeship. His family emigrated to Virginia in 1783, and he began practicing medicine at the age of seventeen.
 
In 1789, he married Mary Worthington of Berkeley County, sister of future Governor of Ohio Thomas Worthington. She died, childless, in 1808. A year after their marriage, the Tiffins joined the Methodist church after hearing the preaching of Thomas Scott, who would be their neighbor and friend for many years. Bishop Asbury ordained Tiffin a deacon of the Methodist church November 19, 1792, authorizing him to preach. Tiffin and Worthington inherited sixteen slaves when Worthington's father died. They each decided to manumit their slaves and move to the Northwest Territory, where slavery was outlawed. Tiffin headed westward, along with Thomas Worthington, in 1798, settling in Chillicothe, Ohio.

Northwest Territory
Tiffin became the first doctor in Chillicothe, traveling on horseback, day and night, to treat the afflicted. He arrived with a letter addressed to the governor of the Northwest Territory, Arthur St. Clair from George Washington, recommending him for public office. Tiffin served as the Speaker of the Territorial House of Representatives from 1799 to 1801 and as president of the 1802 Constitutional Convention, where he cast a tie-breaking vote to deny the voting franchise to the new state's 337 African American residents.  He was a leader of the Chillicothe Junto, a group of Chillicothe Democratic-Republican politicians who brought about the admission of Ohio as a state in 1803 and largely controlled its politics for some years thereafter. Among his colleagues in the faction were Thomas Worthington and Nathaniel Massie.

Tiffin was the obvious choice for the governorship when Ohio was admitted to the Union. He was elected almost without opposition to a first term and re-elected by similarly overwhelming numbers two years later. Tiffin acted promptly to stop the Burr conspiracy in his second term.

Tiffin was elected to the U.S. Senate in 1806 and resigned the governorship in March 1807 to take his seat. He served only two years, however, resigning after the death of his wife. "He was ever faithful to the interests of the West and diligent in seeking the welfare of its inhabitants. He procured an appropriation of public money for the improvement of the Ohio River. He secured better and speedier transportation of the mails; a better and more rapid system for the surveys of western lands; and urged such modifications of the laws regarding sales of western land as would, to use his own words, 'guard the purchasers of them from unnecessary embarrassments and frequent ruin.' " He also voted for the expulsion of the other Ohio Senator, John Smith, who had been implicated in the Burr Conspiracy. He spent only a few months at home, however, before being elected to the Ohio House of Representatives, where he served as speaker from 1809 to 1811. Tiffin remarried April 16, 1809, to Mary Porter, originally from Delaware, and then of Ross County. Tiffin became the first commissioner of the General Land Office, which managed allocations of Federal lands.

He quickly helped remove the Federal records from Washington before it was sacked during the War of 1812. In 1814, he became the Surveyor General of the Northwest Territory, exchanging positions with Josiah Meigs so that he might spend more time near his home in Chillicothe. Tiffin served in the post until his death.

Death
Tiffin was buried in Grandview Cemetery, Chillicothe, Ross County, Ohio. His death was reported in the newspapers, such as this notice in the Brattleboro Messenger (Brattleboro, VT), Sep. 18, 1829, p. 3:
At Chillicothe, Doct. Edward Tiffin, formerly Governor of Ohio, and late Surveyor General of the United States, aged 64 years.

Legacy
The city of Tiffin in northwestern Ohio was named in honor of Tiffin in 1822.

See also
 List of United States senators born outside the United States
 List of U.S. state governors born outside the United States

Notes

References

External links

1766 births
1829 deaths
Governors of Ohio
Speakers of the Ohio House of Representatives
Northwest Territory officials
United States senators from Ohio
Politicians from Chillicothe, Ohio
English emigrants to the United States
English-American culture in Ohio
Ohio Democratic-Republicans
Ohio Constitutional Convention (1802)
Democratic-Republican Party United States senators
Northwest Territory House of Representatives
American surveyors
General Land Office Commissioners
Methodists from Ohio
Physicians from Virginia
Burials at Grandview Cemetery (Chillicothe, Ohio)
Democratic-Republican Party state governors of the United States
Surveyors General of the Northwest Territory
18th-century American politicians
19th-century American politicians